In Northwest Territories, Canada, education is governed by the Department of Education, Culture and Employment (ECE).

References